Naminatha was the twenty-first tirthankara of the present half time cycle, Avsarpini. He was born to the King Vijaya and Queen Vipra of the Ikshvaku dynasty. King Vijaya was the ruler of Mithila at that time. Naminatha lived for 10,000 years. When Naminatha was in his mother's womb, Mithila was attacked by a group of powerful kings. The aura of Naminatha forced all the kings to surrender to King Vijaya.

Legends 
Naminatha was born on the 8th day of Shravan Krishna of the lunisolar Jain calendar. He attained Kevala Jnana under a Bakula tree. He had 17 Ganadhara, Suprabha being the leader. According to Jain tradition, he liberated his soul by destroying all of his karma and attained Moksha from Sammed Shikhar nearly 571,750 years before Neminatha. He was preceded by Munisuvrata who is believed to have lived 570,000 years before him.

See also

God in Jainism
Arihant (Jainism)
Jainism

References

Notes

Sources

External links

Tirthankaras
Jainism in Mithila